Nanjai Uthukuli Canal is an irrigation canal that runs in the southern part of Erode city in Tamil Nadu. This canal gets its source of water from Perumpallam Anicut, near Surampatti.

This canal irrigates around 2500acres of farm land by its 15 km journey through the areas of Kasipalayam, Sastri Nagar, Moolapalayam, Nochikattuvalasu, Karukkampalayam, Subbarayavalasu, Lakkapuram, 46 Pudur, Muthugoundenpalayam, Chinniyampalayam, and Nanjai Uthukuli. This canal terminates its journey near the wetland in the north of Savadipalayam Pudur.

Impact of Urbanization

With the higher level of urbanization in Erode, the canal gets severely affected with solid wastes and sewerage from the surrounding residential areas. Accumulation of plastic wastes and garbage is the major threat faced by this water channel, which caused the channel to be dry in most times of the year. Erode Municipal Corporation and other local agencies occasionally take a clean-up routine and clear the water channel from pollution.

See also
 Perumpallam Canal
 Pichaikaranpallam Canal
 Sunnambu Canal

References

Erode district
Canals in Tamil Nadu